Allied Deals Incorporated "Allied Deals Inc." was a company specializing in the trade-brokerage of non-ferrous metals and widely acknowledged as one of the biggest ever cases of Ponzi Scheme bank fraud in legal history.
The company, along with affiliates: Hampton Lane, Inc.; SAI Commodity Inc.; and RBG Resources Plc. operated a Ponzi Scheme in the United States of America and the United Kingdom Of Great Britain on a virtually unprecedented scale and defrauding approximately 20 banks out of a massive $683USD million. Victims included: J.P. Morgan Chase & Company; Fleet National Bank; PNC Bank, N.A.; KBC Bank, N.V.; Hypo Vereins Bank, N.A.; Dresdner Bank Lateinamerika AG; China Trust Bank; and General Bank. Controlled by brothers Narendra & Virendra Rastogi, Allied Deals Inc. was based in Piscataway, New Jersey. The Rastogi family started trading metals in India during the 1950s, and in 2002 was even listed in the London Sunday Times Rich List.  
Allied Deals Inc. established hundreds of sham companies to allegedly trade in non-ferrous metals, and in the process committed a litany of criminal acts including: forging documents, faking credit histories, and impersonation of another person - acting as buyers to the banks. The scheme collapsed in 2002 with the legal outcome of fifteen people arrested and charged in the U.S.A. Nine pleaded guilty; five were convicted by Jury; and one of the accused acquitted of all charges. Two further defendants in the U.S.A. are still at large. Three people in the U.K. were also convicted and found guilty.

References

External links
 Con Artist Hall of Infamy - The Inductees: Rastogi Brothers

Corporate crime
Finance fraud
Pyramid and Ponzi schemes